Wolfe is a masculine given name. Notable people and characters with the name include:

People
 Wolfe Bowart (born 1962), American comedian
 L. Wolfe Gilbert (1886–1970), Russian Empire-born American Tin Pan Alley songwriter
 Wolfe Glick (born 1995), American streamer and youtuber
 Wolfe Kelman (1923–1990), Austrian-born American rabbi
 Wolfe von Lenkiewicz (born 1966), British artist
 Wolfe Londoner (1842–1912), American politician
 Wolfe Mays (1912–2005), British philosopher
 Wolfe Morris (1925–1996), British film and television actor
 Wolfe Perry (born 1957), American actor and basketball player
 Wolfe Tone (1763–1798), Irish revolutionary
 Wolfe Wagner, Irish clergyman

Characters
 Professor Wolfe Kinteh, a fictional forensic scientist from the TV series Wolfe

See also
 Wolfe (disambiguation)
 Wolf (name), given name and surname

Masculine given names